"Cheap Love" is a song written and recorded by Del Shannon for his 1983 album Drop Down and Get Me. The song became a top-ten hit for Juice Newton in 1986.

Juice Newton version

American country music singer Juice Newton released her rendition of "Cheap Love" on the album Old Flame. By 1985, Newton's stardom as a country pop singer had waned and her 1985 album, Old Flame, took her in an emphatically country music direction with great success as its first two singles, "You Make Me Want to Make You Mine" and "Hurt", both reached of which topped the Billboard Hot Country Singles chart. After a third single release, "Old Flame", reached number five on the same chart, RCA elected to release "Cheap Love" as a fourth single from the album in August 1986. The single peaked at number nine on the Billboard Hot Country Singles chart.

"Cheap Love" was later covered by Marty Stuart, under the name "Sweet Love", for his 1996 album Honky Tonkin's What I Do Best. Stuart's version was released as the final single from the album in August 1997.

Chart performance

References

1986 singles
1997 singles
Del Shannon songs
Marty Stuart songs
Juice Newton songs
RCA Records singles
Song recordings produced by Richard Landis
Songs written by Del Shannon
1983 songs